Air Express Sweden was a charter airline based in Stockholm, Sweden. Originally being owned by Swedish investment group Salénia (which also owns Skyways Express and Amapola Flyg), it belongs to MCA Airlines since 2009. All formerly operated aircraft were merged into the MCA fleet, too.

See also
 Airlines
 Transport in Sweden

External links
Official website (now redirects to MCA Airlines)

Defunct airlines of Sweden
Airlines disestablished in 2009